Scams in intellectual property include scams in which inventors and other rights holders are lured to pay money for an apparently official registration of their intellectual property, or for professional development and promotion of their ideas, but do not receive the expected services.

Intellectual property (IP) is a very complex area and covers a vast range of diverse subjects. As a result, there are opportunities for unscrupulous individuals and organizations to take advantage of those wishing to secure protection for their IP.

Registration services
Registration services are organizations or individuals that contact IP applicants or owners and request payment for an apparently official registration of their IP.

Many applicants for and owners of patents, trademarks and industrial design rights receive letters from such registration services and different IP offices and organizations around the world regularly issue warnings in connection with the offered services.

The registration services target applicants directly because patent, trademark and design applications are published a set time after filing or upon grant along with freely available information about a name and address for the applicant. Registration services use this information to send requests for payment to applicants shortly after publication.  The documents are confusing as they appear to be from official governmental agencies and to be legitimate invoices.

A scam increasing in frequency, as of October 2011, is an email originating from a domain name registrar or IT consulting company based in China that purports to notify a trademark holder that another entity is seeking to register the client's trademark or business name as a domain name in China, Hong Kong, Taiwan, or Asia. The email gives the brand owner a short period in time in which to secure the domain name for their own.  These notifications are essentially solicitations.  Generally, in the event there really is a third-party who is seeking to register your brand name for nefarious purposes, there are channels available for addressing such uses if and when they materialize.

Published warnings for different forms of IP
 American Intellectual Property Law Association (AIPLA) - Patent Registry Scams
 Australian Patent Office - Warning! Unsolicited IP Services
European Community trademarks - Warning
European Community designs - Warning
European patent applications - Information from the European Patent Office
French Patent Office - Warning 
International Trademark Association (INTA) - Warning: Beware Unsolicited Trademark Services
International Bureau of the WIPO (international patent applications) - Warning. A "Practical Advice" regarding the "Measures that are being taken by the International Bureau against fraudulent requests for payment of fees, and actions that can be taken by the applicant or agent" was also published in the PCT Newsletter, July-August 2011, No. 07-08/2011, pp. 13–16.
International trademarks - Warning
Swiss Patent Office - Warning
United Kingdom patent applications - Warning: Unsolicited mail about unofficial registration services
United Kingdom trade marks - Warning: Unsolicited mail about unofficial registration services

PCT registration services
Registration services are known to target applicants of international patent applications. The World Intellectual Property Organization (WIPO) has issued a warning about several of these services, including:
IPTO - International Patent & Trademark Organization
RIPT - Register of International Patents and Trademarks
IBIP - International Bureau for Intellectual Property
ODM - Patent Trademark Register
IBFTPR - International Bureau for Federated Trademark & Patent Register
IOIP - Organization for Intellectual Property
ODM - Register of International Patents
ODM - Office Data Management
IOPTS - International Organization for Patent & Trademark Service
FIPTR - Federated Institute for Patent and Trademark Registry Inc. (see "State of Florida v. Federated Institute for Patent and Trademark Registry and Bernd Taubert" )
CPTD - Central Patent & Trademark Database
CCIT - Commercial Center for Industry and Trade
CPD - Central Patent Database
Register of International Patents
Register of International Patent Bulletin/Registre des données bulletin europeén des brevetes
Institut of Commerce for Industry, Trade, Commerce/Wirtschaftsinstitut für Industrie, Handel, Handwerk AG
Central Data-Register of International Patents

Domain slamming

Domain slamming is a form of scam in which an internet service provider (ISP) or domain name registrar attempts to trick customers of different companies into switching from their existing ISP/registrar to the scamming ISP/registrar, under the pretense that the customer is simply renewing their subscription to their old ISP/registrar.

Invention promotion firm scams

An inventor promotion scam or invention promotion scam is a scam where inventors are lured to pay money for development of their invention, or promotion of it, without the development or promotion actually occurring.

Some invention promotion firms have been found to engage in improper and deceptive practices.

Signs of an unscrupulous invention promotion firm include:
Exaggerated claims about the market potential of the invention
Refusal to offer advice in writing, or having all correspondence confined to promotional material and scheduling phone calls.
Request for money immediately and upfront
Money back guarantees - Reputable professionals charge a fee for service and are compensated for their work and, therefore, do not offer money back guarantees.

References

External links
USPTO public forum for invention promoters/promotion firm complaints and responses
Federal Trade Commission Consumer advice concerning Invention Promotion Firms

Confidence tricks
Deception
Fraud
Intellectual property law
Consumer fraud